Andøyposten is a Norwegian language regional newspaper published in  Andenes, Norway.

History and profile
Andøyposten was established in 1979. The paper is based in Andenes and is published three times per week. As of 2005 Schibsted owned 28% of the paper. The publisher is the Harstad Tidende Gruppen, a subsidiary of the Polaris Media ASA.

Andøyposten sold 1,734 copies in 2012. The paper had a circulation of 1,963 copies in 2013.

See also
 List of newspapers in Norway

References

External links
 Official website

1979 establishments in Norway
Newspapers established in 1979
Newspapers published in Norway
Norwegian-language newspapers
Polaris Media